Kolavennu is a village in Krishna District of the Indian state of Andhra Pradesh. It is located in Kankipadu mandal of Nuzvid revenue division. It was named after the riches and investment capabilities of people living in the area viz KOtlu LAkshalu VElu NoorlU (crores, lakhs, thousands, hundreds). Kolavennu has some of earliest producers of Telugu Talkie Kovelamudi bhaskar rao followed by Kancharla Narayana rao who is also a film distributor Premier films, Jyothi films and Kancharla Madhav Rao. A S R Anjaneyulu producer of Pandavavanavasam also hails from this place. Atisit  Mikkilineni hails from Kolavennu.This is also the village where Producer Dr. D. Ramanaidu has built a Ganapathi Temple which is shown in Suresh Productions movies' intro banner.

Geography
It has an average elevation on 6m (22 feet) d while digging). Ramalayam and Anjaneya temples were built at later stage.

Temples

The village has ancient temples such as Shivalayam built by Maddali Lakshmipathy Rayudu in 1878 (7 February 1878). It is  a rare sphatika shivalingam  which has a phani and Ardhanariswara carving, Vishnalayam and also Ramalayam. Anjaneya temples were built at later stage.

References

Villages in Krishna district